Iceland competed at the 1988 Summer Olympics in Seoul, South Korea.

Competitors
The following is the list of number of competitors in the Games.

Results by event

Athletics

Men
Field events

Women
Track & road events

Field events

Handball

Summary
Key:
 ET – After extra time
 P – Match decided by penalty-shootout.

Kristján Arason
Alfreð Gíslason
Guðmundur Guðmundsson
Sigurður Gunnarsson
Atli Hilmarsson
Guðmundur Hrafnkelsson
Brynjar Kvaran
Þorgils Mathiesen
Páll Ólafsson
Bjarki Sigurðsson
Jakob Sigurðsson
Geir Sveinsson
Sigurður Sveinsson
Einar Þorvarðarson
Karl Þráinsson

Judo

Men's 95 kg
 Bjarni Friðriksson

Men's +95 kg
 Sigurður Bergmann

Sailing

Men

Swimming

Men

Women

References

sports-reference

Nations at the 1988 Summer Olympics
1988
Summer Olympics